RDT may refer to:

Digital technology
 Real Data Transport, a proprietary data transport protocol
 Remote data transmission, the transmission of data between computers over a medium using a communications protocol
 Remote digital terminal, in telecommunications
 Reliable Data Transfer, in computer networking

Medicine
 Rapid diagnostic test

People
 Raúl de Tomás
 RealDonaldTrump

Organisations
 Rangoon Development Trust
 Rosslyn Data Technologies
 Royal Danish Theatre

Transport
 Radlett railway station (National Rail station code), England
 Richard Toll Airport (IATA code)